Heneghan is a surname. Notable people with the surname include:

Elizabeth Heneghan, Canadian judge
James Heneghan (1930–2021), British Canadian author

See also
Heneghan Peng architects was established in New York in 1999 but relocated to Dublin in 2001